Morena Lok Sabha constituency is one of the 29 Lok Sabha constituencies in Madhya Pradesh state in central India. This constituency was reserved for the candidates belonging to the Scheduled castes in 1967 when it was also made a stand-alone constituency. This constituency presently covers the entire Sheopur and Morena districts.

Assembly segments
Presently, Morena Lok Sabha constituency comprises the following eight Vidhan Sabha segments:

Members of Parliament

Election results

General Elections 2019

General Elections 2014

General Elections 2009

See also
 Morena district
 List of Constituencies of the Lok Sabha

References
Election Commission of India -http://www.eci.gov.in/StatisticalReports/ElectionStatistics.asp

External links
Morena lok sabha  constituency election 2019 result details

Lok Sabha constituencies in Madhya Pradesh
Morena district